The Zindlenspitz (2,097 m) is a mountain of the Schwyzer Alps, located on the border between the Swiss cantons of Schwyz and Glarus. It lies on the range between the Wägitalersee and the Obersee, south of the Brünnelistock.

References

External links

Zindlenspitz on Hikr

Mountains of the Alps
Mountains of Switzerland
Mountains of the canton of Schwyz
Mountains of the canton of Glarus
Glarus–Schwyz border
Two-thousanders of Switzerland